Iyunga Mapinduzi is an administrative ward in the Mbeya Rural district of the Mbeya Region of Tanzania. In 2016 the Tanzania National Bureau of Statistics report there were 8,130 people in the ward, from 7,377 in 2012.

Villages and hamlets 
The ward has 5 villages, and 36 hamlets.

 Isangati
 Isangati A
 Isangati B
 Isangati C
 Izuo B
 Izuo C
 Izuo Izuo A
 Mpenye
 Ndyeki
 Ntumba
 Igowe
 Igowe
 Isonganya
 Lusungo
 Iyunga Mapinduzi
 Iyunga A
 Iyunga B
 Matenga
 Mpande A
 Mpande B
 Mwasanga A
 Mwasanga B
 Ntyanya
 Shuwa
 Igagu
 Ilanga A
 Ilanga B
 Ilanga C
 Isonso
 Lupembe
 Nsangano
 Shuwa A
 Shuwa B
 Shuwa C
 Madugu
 Madugu "A"
 Madugu "B"
 Shiwele "A"
 Shiwele "B"
 Zola "A"
 Zola "B"

References 

Wards of Mbeya Region